The Pasha Liman Base, or Pashaliman Base, is an Albanian Navy base south of Vlorë, Albania.

History

Cold War history
Pashaliman was the only Soviet base in the Mediterranean in the 1950s. It was the hot spot of conflict between the Soviets and the Albanians in 1961 when Albania pulled out of the Warsaw Pact and the dispute of the four Whiskey-class submarine ownership which Albania had seized. Following the collapse of the Communist regime, the base was rebuilt by Turkey and under a bilateral agreement the Turkish Navy has the right to use it.

Modern history

Three of the Albanian Navy's four Damen Stan patrol vessels were built at Pashaliman, the most recent completed in 2014.  Currently, four retired Whiskey-class submarines previously owned by the Soviet Union are still located on the facility alongside Albania's active-duty naval vessels. They can be seen via satellite images of the base.

The Naval Force often operates naval exercises in the Bay of Vlorë, out of Pashaliman. This includes exercises with other nations, such as the United Kingdom. The most recent exercise, Sarex '16, took place in April 2016.

An Albanian-Turkish military cooperation agreement was signed in 1992 that encompassed rebuilding Albania's Pasha Liman Base by Turkey alongside granted access for Turkish use.

Civilian facilities
A civilian naval engineering firm and shipyard also operate out of the military facility, providing a wide range of services.

See also
Porto Palermo Tunnel
Albania–Turkey relations

References

Albanian Navy bases
Installations of the Soviet Navy
Albania–Soviet Union relations
Warsaw Pact
Submarine bases
Turkish Navy bases
Buildings and structures in Vlorë
Military installations of the Soviet Union in other countries
Albania–Turkey relations